The OKC-3S is a bayonet developed by the United States Marine Corps to replace the M7 bayonet and M9 bayonet as its service bayonet for the M16 family of rifles and M4 series carbine. This multipurpose bayonet provides greater durability than the M7 and also functions as a fighting knife.

History

The OKC-3S is part of a series of weapon improvements begun in 2001 by Commandant of the Marine Corps James L. Jones to expand and toughen hand-to-hand combat training for Marines, including training in the Marine Corps Martial Arts Program and knife fighting. In the Multi-Purpose Bayonet program, 33 different knives were evaluated. The OKC-3S performed best, or next to best, in nearly all testing categories. A contract for OKC-3S was made in December 2002 and production and distribution began in January 2003.

Design

The OKC-3S is manufactured solely by the Ontario Knife Company and identical civilian versions are available for purchase. It bears a resemblance to the Marines' iconic Ka-Bar fighting knife, though it is not fullered. It is larger, thicker and heavier than the M7 although slightly thinner and lighter than the current U.S. Army-issued M9. A sharper point helps penetrate body armor that many modern adversaries wear; while serrations near the handle help improve its function as a utility knife. In one demonstration, a prototype was able to pierce a punching bag covered with aircraft aluminum and a ballistic vest. The entire weapon is designed to be corrosion resistant, and weighs  with its sheath. The scabbard and grip are colored to match the Corps' coyote tan gear, compatible with both woodland and desert camouflage. The NATO Stock Number is 1095-01-521-6087.

The serrations measure  of the blade length on the true edge. The blade also has a non-reflective phosphate finish.

The grip is made of Dynaflex, a synthetic non-slip material, is ergonomically grooved, and is more oval than round. This design helps prevent repetitive-strain injuries and hand fatigue during training. It also features an embossed Eagle, Globe, and Anchor molded in to allow a user to identify the direction of the blade in the dark. The encapsulated tang connects the cross guard/muzzle ring (which is ) and pommel latch plate that clasps the barrel lug; both are phosphate coated like the blade. Former Ontario Knife Company president and chief executive Nick Trbovich Jr. said of it: "We spent a lot of time making sure the handle was ergonomically correct… There are no blister points on the handle."

The polyester elastomer scabbard, designed by Natick Labs, offers a weight and noise reduction from the previous M7 Scabbard and is ILBE compatible. It has a fitted internal stainless steel spring and friction device at its throat to secure the bayonet. A ceramic-coated aluminum honing rod is located on the back of the scabbard. The scabbard is compatible with the MOLLE/PALS modular attachment system. The scabbard lacks the wire cutter of the M9 for use when assaulting beaches or other concertina wire–fortified obstacles.

See also

 List of individual weapons of the U.S. armed forces
 List of weapons of the United States Marine Corps

References

 
 
 
 

Bayonets of the United States
Military knives
United States Marine Corps equipment
Military equipment introduced in the 2000s